Pseudomiza flavitincta is a species of moth of the  family Geometridae. It is found in Taiwan.

References

Moths described in 1915
Ennominae
Moths of Taiwan